Licun could refer to the following locations in China:

 Licun Township (利村乡), Yudu County, Jiangxi
 Licun Subdistrict (里村街道), Zhushan District, Jingdezhen, Jiangxi
Towns
 Licun, Guangxi (黎村镇), in Rong County
 Licun, Fengcheng, Jiangxi (丽村镇)
 Licun, Shanxi (里村镇), in Quwo County
Written as "李村镇":
 Licun, Shijiazhuang, in Luquan, Hebei
 Licun, Xingtai, in Qiaoxi District, Xingtai, Hebei
 Licun, Henan, in Luolong District, Luoyang
 Licun, Shandong, in Mudan District, Heze